KKXS (96.1 FM, "XS Sports 96.1") is a commercial radio station licensed in Shingletown, California, broadcasting to the Shasta & Tehama County areas.  KKXS airs a sports format and is an affiliate of CBS Sports Radio.  It is now the region's flagship station for San Francisco Giants, San Francisco 49ers and San Jose Sharks.

History
KKXS was once the home for Red 96.1 (KBHX) now on (103.1 and 93.3) from 2001 until 2003, then it was the home of Kicks 96, a country station which was a more classic country alternative to Q-97 until 2005. The station was an affiliate of Broadcast Architecture's Smooth Jazz Network until March 1, 2010, when KKXS switched to ESPN Radio.  They also air live video streams of Shasta College Knights football.

Previous logo

References

External links
XS Sports 96.1 official website

KXS
Sports radio stations in the United States
Radio stations established in 2001
Shasta County, California
Tehama County, California
2001 establishments in California